Oleg Vladimirovich Kalugin (born 23 December 1989) is a Russian football midfielder. He plays for FC Tekstilshchik Ivanovo.

Club career
He made his debut in the Russian Second Division for FC Avangard Kursk on 16 April 2013 in a game against FC Sokol Saratov.

He made his Russian Football National League debut for FC Torpedo Moscow on 13 July 2019 in a game against FC Baltika Kaliningrad.

References

External links
 

1989 births
People from Shebekino
Living people
Russian footballers
Association football midfielders
FC Torpedo Moscow players
FC Avangard Kursk players
FC Energomash Belgorod players
FC KAMAZ Naberezhnye Chelny players
FC Tekstilshchik Ivanovo players
Sportspeople from Belgorod Oblast